Nik Muhammad Zawawi bin Salleh  (Jawi:  ; is a Malaysian politician who has served as Member of Parliament (MP) for Pasir Puteh since May 2018. He served as Deputy Minister of Agriculture and Food Industries II in the Barisan Nasional (BN) administration under former Prime Minister Ismail Sabri Yaakob and former Minister Ronald Kiandee from August 2021 to the collapse of the BN administration in November 2022, Chairman of the Farmers Organisation Authority (FOA), Deputy Chairman of the Perikatan Nasional Backbenchers Club from 2020 to 2021 and Member of the Terengganu State Legislative Assembly (MLA) for Kuala Besut from November 1999 to March 2004. He is a member of the Malaysian Islamic Party (PAS), a component party of the Perikatan Nasional (PN) coalition. He has also served as Dewan Ulamak Chief of PAS since July 2019.

Education 

Obtained a Bachelor's degree from Usuluddin (Tafseer) from Al-Azhar University, Egypt in 1990. He later went on to study Bachelor of Arts in Aqeedah & Philosophy from Al Al-Bayt University, Jordan.  After earning his Bachelor's degree in 1997, he returned to his homeland and served as a lecturer at Ismail Petra International Islamic College from 1998 to 1999. He completed his PhD at Universiti Kebangsaan Malaysia in the field of Preaching & Leadership.

Election results

Honours
  :
  Knight Commander of the Order of the Territorial Crown (PMW) – Datuk (2022)

References

Living people
1967 births
People from Kelantan
Malaysian people of Malay descent
Members of the Dewan Rakyat
21st-century Malaysian politicians
Malaysian Islamic Party politicians